Petri Matikainen (born 7 January 1967) is a Finnish former ice hockey player and current coach.

Matikainen was born in Savonlinna. Originally playing for SaPKo, he moved to play two seasons of junior hockey in Oshawa Generals. He was part of the team that won J. Ross Robertson Cup in 1987. In the same year, he also won IIHF World U20 Championship with Finnish team. He returned to Finland and played two years in Tappara, five years in Jokipojat and two years in KalPa. In 1996 he moved to play for Berlin Capitals. He also played for Klagenfurter AC before retiring in 1999.

Coaching career
In 2003, he started his coaching career with Lahti Pelicans U20 team, and became head coach of their senior team in the following year. The team was not competitive and they ended last of 13 teams that year. He then became assistant coach of Blues in 2005 and spent two years as an assistant before being promoted as head coach in 2007. He was awarded Kalevi Numminen trophy in 2008 and 2010 after Blues got silver medals.

In 2010, he was chosen as an assistant coach of Finnish national team. The season 2011–2012 Matikainen coached  HIFK Helsinki.
In summer 2012 he signed a tree year contract to Avangard Omsk (KHL).
In 2014 he signed a one-year contract to HC Slovan Bratislava (KHL).
 In the spring 2015 he signed a tree year contract to Lahti Pelicans.

Petri Matikainen moved to Austria to coaching EC KAC in 2018. Klagenfurter AC led by Matikainen, has won the Austrian League championship for the second time in a row.

Career statistics

References

External links 

Living people
1967 births
Finnish ice hockey defencemen
Finnish ice hockey coaches
Jokipojat players
KalPa players
Oshawa Generals players
SaPKo players
Tappara players
People from Savonlinna
Buffalo Sabres draft picks
Finnish expatriate ice hockey players in Germany
Finnish expatriate ice hockey players in Canada
Sportspeople from South Savo
Finnish expatriate ice hockey players in Austria
Finnish expatriate ice hockey players in Slovakia